The Poole Logboat is an ancient logboat made from a single oak tree. It was excavated in the town of Poole, Dorset, England. The boat is over 2,200 years old and is estimated through carbon dating to have been constructed around 200–300 BCE, likely around 295BC.

The Iron Age vessel was unearthed in 1964 during dredging work in Poole Harbour. After it was found it was kept submerged in water for 30 years while archaeologists decided what to do with it. It was restored by members of York Archaeological Trust and dried for two years. The boat is on display in Poole Museum. The boat has been described as one of the finest examples in Western Europe.

As an internationally significant object, the logboat has been fully recorded digitally using 3D scanning.

The logboat is of a shell built design type that has a 'fitted transom added'. The boat has a reasonable degree of stability and seaworthiness. With a freeboard of 0.76m, research has determined the logboat could support the weight of up to 18 persons (weighing 60kg) each.

References

Bibliography

External links
 Link to Logboat, Poole Borough Council, 2007
 Poole Museum

Tourist attractions in Poole
Ancient boats
Poole Harbour